The Hundred of Yednalue is a cadastral unit of hundred in the County of Granville, South Australia.

History
The Hundred of Yednalue was proclaimed on 18 January 1877 in the County of Granville.

In 1885, it was reported that "all the spinifex or porcupine grass which affords both food and shelter for the rabbits
was systematically burned so the rabbits [...] became an easy prey for dogs".

The Yednalue School opened in 1887 and closed in 1926.

The hundred was first locally governed by the District Council of Hawker when it was established in 1888. The hundred was represented by Yednalue ward, electing one dedicated councillor. In 1997 local administration of the hundred moved to the Flinders Ranges Council following the amalgamation of Hawker and Kanyaka councils.

See also 
 Lands administrative divisions of South Australia

References 

Yednalue